Benjamin Minge Duggar (September 1, 1872 – September 10, 1956) was an American plant physiologist. He was born at Gallion, Hale County, Alabama.

Biography
He studied at several Southern schools, including Alabama Polytechnic Institute (B.S., 1891), and at Harvard, Cornell (Ph.D., 1898), and in Germany, Italy, and France.  As a specialist in botany, he held various positions in experiment stations and colleges until 1901, when he was appointed physiologist in the Bureau of Plant Industry, United States Department of Agriculture, for which he wrote bulletins.  He was professor of botany at the University of Missouri from 1902 to 1907 and thereafter held the chair of plant physiology at Cornell.  He was vice president of the Botanical Society of America in 1912 and 1914.  From 1917 to 1919, he was acting professor of biological chemistry at the Washington University Medical School. Surprisingly, he is best remembered for an achievement in another discipline occurring in the late 1940s, his discovery of chlortetracycline (Aureomycin), the first of the tetracycline antibiotics, from a soil bacterium growing in allotment soil.  Professor Duggar contributed many articles to botanical magazines.  His publications include:  
 Fungous Diseases of Plants (1909)
 Plant Physiology (1911)
 Mushroom Growing (1915)

See also

 Tetracycline

References

External links
 Benjamin Minge Duggar

 

American botanists
People from Hale County, Alabama
American science writers
Auburn University alumni
Harvard University alumni
Cornell University College of Agriculture and Life Sciences alumni
Cornell University faculty
University of Missouri faculty
1872 births
1956 deaths
Washington University in St. Louis faculty
Plant physiologists